The 2007 Shakey's V-League (SVL) season was the fourth season of the Shakey's V-League.

1st conference 

The Shakey's V-League 4th Season 1st Conference was the 6th conference of the Shakey's V-League. The tournament was held from May 2007 until July 2007.

Participating teams

Finals 
 All times are in Philippines Standard Time (UTC+08:00)
 3rd place

|}
 Championship

|}

Final standings

Individual awards

2nd conference 

The Shakey's V-League 4th Season 2nd Conference was the 7th conference of the Shakey's V-League.

Participating teams

Semi-finals 

|}

 Finals play-offs
 All times are in Philippines Standard Time (UTC+08:00)

|}

Finals 
 3rd place

|}
 Championship

|}

Final standings

Individual awards

Venues 
 The Arena, San Juan City

References 

2007 in Philippine sport